Toram (also known as Torom and Torum) is an Afro-Asiatic language spoken in central Chad. Speakers have shifted to Chadian Arabic.

Notes

References 
Alio, Khalil. 2004. Préliminaires à une étude de la langue kajakse d'Am-Dam, de toram du Salamat, d'ubi du Guéra et de masmaje du Batha-Est (Tchad). In: Gábor Takács (ed.), Egyptian and Semito-Hamitic (Afro-Asiatic) studies: in memoriam W. Vycich,. 229–285. Leiden: Brill.

East Chadic languages
Languages of Chad